Invincible class may refer to:

 , 1980s British Royal Navy class
 , British Royal Navy class in service from 1908 to 1921

See also